Shaida  Buari (born 25 July 1982) is a Ghanaian businesswoman, philanthropist, model, and the title winner of the 2002 Miss Ghana beauty pageant.

Early life and education

Shaida Buari was born in Accra, Ghana to Alhaji Sidiku Buari; a business magnate as well as a musician who for 12 years, held the office of the president of the Musician Union of Ghana, and Elizabeth Mirabelle Odonkor who runs a bridal shop and PR service for women in Accra. Her parents divorced in 1997. She has two younger brothers: Sidiku Buari Jnr., an engineer who runs his own auto shop, and King Faisal Buari; motivational speaker and owner of the Buarich Group of Companies. Nadia Buari, is her half sister. She attended the Alsyd Academy for her basic education. She went to St. Mary's High School in Accra, where she was elected entertainment prefect and held fundraisers for several school projects.  It was also in high school that her modelling career took off after she won the (now defunct) Source modeling competition in 1998. Following appearances in several television commercials, she entered and won the Miss Ghana pageant in 2002, with which she started her philanthropic work.
She also competed in the FACE of Africa Modelling Competition where she made it to the Final Five.

Shaida graduated with honors from the University of Ghana, majoring in Psychology with a minor in political science in (year).
She volunteered at the psychiatry hospital in Accra where she researched on the correlation between tumor location and mental illness at the Korle-bu teaching hospital for a year.

Shaida married Mr Kunle Nubi in 2011. They founded the Oil & Gas Entity ENERGEM.

Career 
Shaida represented Ghana in the Miss World Pageant in 2003. As part of her social responsibility project as title winner, she worked with UNICEF, Right To Play on projects relating to sensitisation on social stigma that plagues HIV/AIDS patients, as well as helping to educate parents on the importance of certain vaccinations in helping curb diseases in young children.
This exposure let to her forming her Non Profit organization; Helplink Foundation. Shaida in collaboration with certain corporate entities successfully footed the hospital bills of a number of children who needed that assistance.

Philanthropy and other endeavours
In 2013, while pregnant with her son, she founded Tellitmoms.com which is a viral online community for moms and moms to be, which among other things, provides tips on parenting and childcare. Tellitmoms in collaboration with NP Ghandour donated hand sanitizers and overalls to the maternity ward at Korle Bu Teaching Hospital. Also, it organizes a series of events where they showcase products and services for parents and parents to be. They gave out a few car seats to help encourage child car safety in Africa.
She has since collaborated with Gloradelle, Graco Ghana, Audylot, Mini Me, Naabils, Iye Naturals, Sahara Rise, Disney Ghana, Baby Beds Beddings and Beyond, Baby Foods and More, Haute Mummy Maternity, Adora Intimate, Selina BeB, Bvenaj, Buarich Group, Kaa Service, Bon Collection, Nature’s Brew, Beva Collection, Bri Wireduah, Rhema Collection, Cheerbaby, women reproductive health, Rubies House of Beauty, amongst others.

References

Living people
1982 births
Ghanaian beauty pageant winners
Ghanaian businesspeople
Ghanaian philanthropists
Ghana
Ghanaian models